Christopher Louis Wreford-Brown DSO RN (born August 1945) is a retired British Royal Navy officer.

Falklands War
He was captain of HM Submarine Conqueror during the Falklands War, during which Conqueror attacked and destroyed the Argentine Navy's cruiser the ARA General Belgrano. For the Falklands patrol he was awarded the Distinguished Service Order. He is currently the only naval officer to have commanded a nuclear submarine which has sunk a warship in war operations. When asked about the incident later, Wreford-Brown responded, "The Royal Navy spent thirteen years preparing me for such an occasion. It would have been regarded as extremely dreary if I had fouled it up."

Operation Barmaid
In July 1982 Wreford-Brown captained HMS Conqueror in an operation during the Cold War in the Barents Sea, where it carried out a successful clandestine sub-surface raid to capture Soviet Navy hydrophonic sonar equipment from Warsaw Pact vessels upon the high sea for technical analysis by the North Atlantic Treaty Organization.

Later naval career
He became commanding officer of the frigate HMS Cornwall as well as Captain of 8th Frigate Squadron in 1988. His other commands include the diesel submarine HMS Opossum and the nuclear submarine HMS Valiant.

Post-military career
Wreford-Brown retired from the Royal Navy in 1995 with the rank of Captain, and was employed as a Director of Paignton Zoo until his retirement in 2010.

References

1945 births
Living people
Companions of the Distinguished Service Order
Royal Navy personnel of the Falklands War
Royal Navy submarine commanders
Date of birth missing (living people)